Granodomus is a genus of air-breathing land snails, terrestrial pulmonate gastropod molluscs in the subfamily Polydontinae  of the family Sagdidae.

Species 
Species in the genus Granodomus include:
 Granodomus lima (Férussac, 1821)

References

 Bank, R. A. (2017). Classification of the Recent terrestrial Gastropoda of the World. Last update: July 16, 2017

Sagdidae